The Tecra is a series of business laptops currently manufactured by Dynabook Inc., a subsidiary of Sharp Corporation formerly owned by Toshiba. The number of Tecra notebook models available for sale is strictly dependent on the location: North and South America, Europe, Africa and South Africa, the Middle East or the South Pacific region.

History

Origin
The first Tecra notebook models were released in 1996, including the Tecra 500CS and the Tecra 500CDT. Both notebook models had the same design and featured similar hardware specification. The Tecra laptops built in 1996 dimensions of 299 x 235 x 58mm, with a weight of 3.4kg with integrated AC adaptor. The Lithium-Ion battery (not used in Satellite notebooks before 1997) offered a standard productivity up to two hours.
The original designers of the Tecra were two engineers working at Netel communications. Kenneth Rolls and Kenneth Bailey. Original release of the Tecra was to the engineers of Nextel communications, to improve workflow and speed. Mostly used for process of cellular data. Then released general public.

Toshiba marketed both 500CS and 500CDT as fast notebooks that feature information highway with no speed limits. Toshiba included in Tecra 500CS and Tecra 500CDT important hardware features for 1996, including Intel Pentium SL Enh (120 MHz), standard main memory of 16 MB EDO RAM expandable to 144 MB EDO RAM, a hard drive of 1.350 million bytes, both floppy disk and CD-ROM drive (optional), two CardBus, Desk Station V Plus PCI bus, Card Station II, PCI bus, and ZV Port. However, the Tecra 500CS had a 12.1 inches STN LCD color display with a resolution of 800 x 600 pixels, while the Tecra 500CDT has a 12.1 inches TFT LCD color display with the 800 x 600 pixels resolution.

By September 2000 Toshiba implemented a common platform philosophy which delivered the investment protection that IT decision makers demanded. The Tecra 8100 notebook reduced long term Total Costs of Ownership. Toshiba offered the Tecra 8100 with four different processor speeds (Pentium III 500 MHz, Pentium III 600 MHz, Pentium III 650 MHz, and Pentium III 700 MHz). The basic configuration was also available in two diagonal display, 13.3 inches and 14.1 inches. The Tecra 8100 also included a floppy disk, CD-ROM drive or DVD-ROM drive, S3 Savage MX graphic adapter, two PC Card Type II or one PC Card Type III, Card Bus support, memory expansion slot, SelectBay modules, and Lithium-Ion battery (with an autonomy up to four hours). By 2000 Toshiba was adding special features to Tecra notebook models, such as Toshiba Hibernation and Resume, Toshiba Power Extensions, SecureSleep, Wake-On-LAN and Service Boot, and System Password Security.

Sharp era

Portfolio
Toshiba is updating the Tecra series by upgrading older models or launching new notebooks, such as Tecra A11. Depending on the location there are currently three notebooks in the Tecra series. Toshiba implemented two latest upgrades in the current Tecra series. The first upgrade regards the operating system. Recent Tecra notebooks are shipped with Windows 7 operating system, while the second upgrade regards the 2010 Intel Core processor Family, which includes faster processors that deliver higher performances with Intel Turbo Boost technology and Intel Hyper Threading technology (available in three performance levels). Toshiba included in the Tecra series features for protection such as PC Health Monitor. Other Tecra laptop features are eSATAp Sleep-and-Charge combo port, and fingerprint reader for a better security. Furthermore, the Tecra series includes notebooks with either 14.1 inches diagonal display or 15.6 high resolution diagonal widescreen. Some current Tecra notebook models have durable texture finish with chrome buttons.

Models

Current Products
Depending on the location the Tecra series includes:
 Tecra A50
 Tecra W50
 Tecra Z40
 Tecra Z50

Previous Products
 Tecra A11
 Tecra R10
 Tecra R940
 Tecra R950
 Tecra R850
 Tecra R840 - 3 Variants
 Tecra M10
 Tecra M11 - 2 Variants

1995-2001
 Tecra 8100
 Tecra 8000
 Tecra 780CDM, 780DVD
 Tecra 750CDM, 750CDT, 750DVD
 Tecra 740CDT
 Tecra 730CDT, 730XCDT
 Tecra 720CDT
 Tecra 710CDT
 Tecra 700CS, 700CT (DSTN color LCD vs TFT color LCD)
 Tecra 550CDS, 550CDT
 Tecra 540CDT
 Tecra 530CDS, 530CDT
 Tecra 520CDS, 520CDT
 Tecra 510CS, 510CDS, 510CDT
 Tecra 500CS, 500CDT

Other Tecra models
 Toshiba Tecra 8200
 Toshiba Tecra 9100
 Toshiba Tecra A10
 Tecra A1
 Tecra A2
 Tecra A3
 Tecra Alol

 Tecra A4
 Tecra A5
 Tecra A7
 Tecra A8
 Tecra A9
 Tecra A11
 Tecra M10
 Tecra M1
 Tecra M2
 Tecra M3
 Tecra M4
 Tecra M5
 Tecra M7
 Tecra M9
 Tecra M11
 Tecra R10
 Tecra S10
 Tecra S1
 Tecra S2
 Tecra S3
 Tecra S4
 Tecra S5

Tecra A5
Toshiba began production of the Tecra A5 in 2005. It has since been superseded by the Tecra A6. Older models include the Tecra 720CDT. They were produced at Toshiba's plants in Yokkaichi and Hangzhou.

The Tecra A5 has 14" WXGA wide screen LCD display with a native resolution of 1280x768 pixels. The laptop's exterior is mostly black but the back of the laptop lid has a silver finish. The laptop has stereo speakers which are located under the LCD display. When compared to its cousin the Satellite, the Tecra is generally more expensive and more business oriented, each having different features and capabilities.
 Features:
The Tecra A5 has a DVD Burner, Multi card reader, Wireless, a headphone and microphone jack, four USB Ports, an S-Video port, RGB port,
an internal 56k modem and an Ethernet port for connecting to LANs. Uses Intel Centrino Duo. Designed for Windows XP.
 Dimensions: are 13.5" x 9.5" x 1.5" (about 340 x 240 x 40 mm) and it weighs about 5 pounds (about 2.2 kg).

 Technical specifications:

References

Bibliography

 Mobile Whack information on the Tecra A5

External links
 Toshiba

Subnotebooks
Consumer electronics brands
Tecra
Business laptops